This is a list of notable individuals associated with Case Western Reserve University, including students, alumni, and faculty.

Arts, journalism and entertainment

 Barbara Allyne Bennet – actress and member of Screen Actors Guild (SAG) national board of directors (2005–2007)
 James Card – longtime film curator at George Eastman House
 Mary Carruthers – among the world's foremost scholars on medieval religious literature
 Janis Carter – film actress of 1940s and '50s
 Gordon Cobbledick - J. G. Taylor Spink Award, the highest award given by the Baseball Writers' Association of America
 Brenda Miller Cooper – operatic soprano
 Franklin Cover – actor, Tom Willis in The Jeffersons
 Jasmine Cresswell – best-selling author of over 50 romance novels
 Anu Garg – author and speaker
 Susie Gharib – co-anchor of Nightly Business Report
 Gregg Gillis – musician; performs as Girl Talk
 Dorothy Hart – film actress of 1940s and '50s
 Jan Hopkins – journalist (CNN financial news show Street Sweep)
 John Howard – actor, known for The Philadelphia Story and Bulldog Drummond films
 Hal Lebovitz - J. G. Taylor Spink Award, the highest award given by the Baseball Writers' Association of America
 Marc Parnell – second-most published ornithologist in the world, author of 41 bird-identification guides
 M. Scott Peck – author of The Road Less Traveled and other self-help books
 Harvey Pekar – comic book writer, creator of American Splendor
 Jack Perkins – dubbed "America's most literate correspondent" by Associated Press; reporter, commentator, war correspondent, anchorman; seen on NBC's Nightly News and The Today Show, and on A&E as host of Biography
 Alan Rosenberg – actor; played Ira Woodbine on TV series Cybill; Emmy-nominated for guest appearance on ER; elected president of Screen Actors Guild in 2005
 Joe Russo and Anthony Russo – brothers, co-alumni, and directors of films Captain America: The Winter Soldier, Captain America: Civil War, Avengers: Infinity War, Avengers: Endgame, Welcome to Collinwood, and TV series Arrested Development; producers of NBC's Community
 Alix Kates Shulman – author of Memoir of an Ex-Prom Queen and To Love What Is
 Rich Sommer – MFA theater alumnus; appeared in The Devil Wears Prada, Mad Men, and with Upright Citizens Brigade
 Emma Rood Tuttle — writer
 Thrity Umrigar – journalist; author of Bombay Time
Andrew Vachss – lawyer and child protection consultant; author of the Burke series
 Roger Zelazny – science fiction and fantasy author; three-time Nebula Award winner and six-time Hugo Award winner; works include Lord of Light, Eye of Cat, and The Dream Master

Business and philanthropy

 William F. Baker – president and CEO of public television's flagship station Thirteen/WNET in New York
 Robert B. Barr – co-founder and co-CEO of investment bank Lincoln International
 Tim Besse – co-founder and CXO of Glassdoor
 Ou Chin-der – former deputy mayor of Taipei, Taiwan; current chairman and CEO of the Taiwan High Speed Rail Corporation
 William Daroff – vice president for public policy at the Jewish Federations of North America; member of the U.S. Commission for the Preservation of America's Heritage Abroad
 Bob Herbold – executive vice president at Microsoft
 Pete Koomen – co-founder and CTO of Optimizely
 Tshilidzi Marwala – academic, businessman and community leader
 Barry Meyer – chairman and former CEO of Warner Bros 
 Allen J. Mistysyn – CFO of Sherwin-Williams
 John Neff – noted value investor who led Vanguard's Windsor Fund, the largest and highest returning mutual fund of the 1980s
 Craig Newmark – founder of Craigslist, tech billionaire, philanthropist
 Philip Orbanes – former VP with Parker Brothers; founding partner and President of Winning Moves
 Arthur L. Parker – founder of Parker Hannifin 
 Richard Thaler (BA '67) – Nobel laureate, father of behavioral finance, and behavioral economics pioneer
 Peter Tippett – inventor of Norton (Symantec) Anti-Virus and CTO of CyberTrust
 Tom Tribone – founder and CEO of Guggenheim Global Infrastructure Company
 Donald E. Washkewicz – former CEO of Parker Hannifin
 Mark Weinberger (JD/MBA '87) – CEO and Chairman of Ernst & Young
 Edward Porter Williams – co-founder of Sherwin-Williams

Education
 Edna Allyn – first librarian of the Hawaii State Library
 George A. Bowman – youngest president in the history of Kent State University
 Clara Breed – librarian, known for her "Dear Miss Breed" correspondence with children in Japanese American internment camps during World War II
Emile B. De Sauzé – language educator known for developing the conversational method of learning a language
 Susan Helper – Frank Tracy Carlton Professor of Economics at the Weatherhead School of Management
 Lena Beatrice Morton – literary scholar, head of the humanities division at Texas College; earned her PhD from Case Western in 1947
 Regenia A. Perry – one of the first African American women to earn a Ph.D. in art history, alumni with M.A (1962) and Ph.D (1966)

Government and military

 John E. Barnes, Jr. – member of Ohio House of Representatives
 Janet Bewley – member of the Wisconsin Legislature
 Justin Bibb – 58th and current Mayor of Cleveland
 Zdravka Bušić – member of the European Parliament
 John Cairncross – Soviet spy and member of the Cambridge Five
 Thomas J. Carran (1841-1894) – Ohio State Senator
 François-Philippe Champagne – Canadian Member of Parliament for Saint-Maurice—Champlain
 Schive Chi – Governor of Fujian Province and Minister without Portfolio, Republic of China (Taiwan)
 Victor Ciorbea – Prime Minister of Romania (1996–1998)
 Bruce Cole – 8th Chairman of the National Endowment for the Humanities
John Charles Cutler – Acting Chief of the venereal disease program in the United States Public Health Service and head of the Guatemala and the Tuskegee syphilis experiments
 Benjamin O. Davis, Jr. – first African-American to receive star in US Air Force; awarded Distinguished Flying Cross in 1943; Assistant Secretary of Transportation under Richard Nixon
 Lincoln Díaz-Balart – U.S. Representative
 Alene B. Duerk – first female Rear Admiral in the United States Navy
 James A. Garfield – served on the University Board of Trustees
 T. Keith Glennan – Case Institute of Technology President, first NASA Administrator
 Subir Gokarn (Ph.D.) – Deputy Governor of the Reserve Bank of India
 Paul Hackett – Iraq War veteran and former Congressional candidate
 Rutherford B. Hayes – 19th President of the United States of America, served on the University Board of Trustees
 John Hutchins – former U.S. Representative
 Stephanie Tubbs Jones – former U.S. Representative
 Ron Klein – U.S. Representative
 Dennis Kucinich – former U.S. Representative
 Clarence K. Lam – Maryland State Senator
 James Thomas Lynn – United States Secretary of Housing and Urban Development under Richard Nixon; Director of the Office of Management and Budget under Gerald Ford
 Josh Mandel (J.D.) – Ohio State Treasurer
 Nicole Nason (J.D.) – Administrator of the Federal Highway Administration
 Ogiame Atuwatse III – 21st Olu of Warri kingdom
 Salvatore Pais – Inventor and Aerospace Engineer, U.S. Navy and Airforce
 Alfredo Palacio – President of Ecuador, completed medical residency at Case
 Raymond Stanton Patton (Ph.B.) – rear admiral and first flag officer of the United States Coast and Geodetic Survey Corps
 Trista Piccola – former Director of the Rhode Island Department of Children, Youth & Families
 Paul A. Russo – Ambassador of the United States to Barbados, Dominica, St Lucia, Antigua, St. Vincent, and St. Christopher-Nevis-Anguilla
 David Satcher – 16th Surgeon General of the United States 
 Milton Shapp – Governor of Pennsylvania and 1976 Democratic presidential candidate
 Louis Stokes – former U.S. Representative
 Don Thomas – former NASA astronaut 
 Elioda Tumwesigye – Member of Parliament Sheema North and Cabinet Minister of Science, Technology and Innovation Republic of Uganda
 Michael R. Turner – U.S. Representative
 William H. Upson – former U.S. Representative
 Andrew R. Wheeler – Deputy Administrator (and Acting Administrator) of the United States Environmental Protection Agency
 Cmdr. John G. Williams, USN - Navy Cross, Distinguished Flying Cross, Silver Star recipient aboard USS Intrepid, 1943-1945
 Milton A. Wolf – former U.S. Ambassador to Austria

History
 Robert C. Binkley – chair of History at Flora Stone Mather College, 1930–1940
 Melvin Kranzberg – professor of history (1952–1971)
 James Alexander Robertson – academic historian, archivist, and bibliographer (Ph.D., 1896)
 Ted Steinberg – two-time Pulitzer Prize nominee (2000 nonfiction and 2002 history)

Law

See Notable Graduates section

 John Hessin Clarke – undergraduate class of 1877, Justice of the Supreme Court of the United States
 Robin Ficker – attorney and NBA heckler
 Fred Gray – attorney to the civil rights movement of the 1950s and 60s, later President of the National Bar Association and first African-American President of the Alabama State Bar
 Edmund A. Sargus, Jr. – U.S. District Court Judge
 James Sokolove – undergraduate class of 1966, pioneer in legal television advertising; philanthropist

Science, technology, and medicine

 Peter B. Armentrout – distinguished chemistry professor, University of Utah
 Roger Bacon – inventor of carbon fiber 
 Hans Baumann – inventor and engineer
 Paul Berg – winner of the 1980 Nobel Prize in Chemistry, for biochemical characterization of recombinant DNA
 John Blangero – human geneticist; highly cited scientist in the field of complex disease genetics
 Murielle Bochud – Swiss physician, co-chief of the Department of Epidemiology and Health Systems at the Unisanté in Lausanne
 Paul Buchheit – 23rd employee of Google and creator of Gmail
 Neil W. Chamberlain – economist and industrial relations scholar (A.B., 1937; M.A., 1939)
 Philippe G. Ciarlet – mathematician known for work on finite element method; received his Ph.D. from the Case Institute of Technology 1966 and was awarded the Légion d'honneur in 1999
 Elizabeth Cosgriff-Hernandez – biomedical engineer who works on scaffolds for tissue regeneration
 M. Jamal Deen, CM – Order of Canada and Senior Canada Research Chair in Information Technology at McMaster University
 Conor P. Delaney – colorectal surgeon known for laparoscopy and developing enhanced recovery pathways
 Herbert Henry Dow – founder of Dow Chemical
 Slayton A. Evans, Jr. – research chemist and professor
 Xyla Foxlin – engineer, entrepreneur and YouTuber
 H. Jack Geiger – founding member and past president of Physicians for Social Responsibility and Physicians for Human Rights
 Julie Gerberding – first woman director of the Centers for Disease Control and Prevention
 Alfred G. Gilman – co-winner of the 1994 Nobel Prize in Physiology or Medicine, for co-discovery of G proteins
 Donald A. Glaser – winner of the 1960 Nobel Prize in Physics, for invention of the bubble chamber
 Millicent Goldschmidt – microbiologist, worked on NASA Lunar Receiving Laboratory and University of Texas
 Siegfried S. Hecker – director of Los Alamos National Laboratory (1986–1997)
 Corneille Heymans – winner of the 1938 Nobel Prize in Physiology or Medicine for work on carotid sinus reflex
 Samuel Hibben – pioneer in blacklight technology; designed the lighting displays for the Statue of Liberty and other national monuments
 Bambang Hidayat – astronomer, former Vice-President of the International Astronomical Union
 George H. Hitchings – co-winner of the 1988 Nobel Prize in Physiology or Medicine, for research leading to development of drugs to treat leukemia, organ transplant rejection, gout, herpes virus, and AIDS-related bacterial and pulmonary infections
 Robert W. Kearns – inventor of the intermittent windshield wiper systems used on most automobiles since 1969; won one of the best-known patent infringement cases against a major corporation
 Donald Knuth – computer scientist and winner of the Turing Award (1974)
 Lawrence M. Krauss – physicist in the field of dark energy; bestselling author (The Physics of Star Trek)
 Polykarp Kusch – winner of the 1955 Nobel Prize in Physics, for determining the magnetic moment of the electron
George Trumbull Ladd (1842–1921) – philosopher, educator, and psychologist; first foreigner to receive the Second (conferred in 1907) and Third (conferred in 1899) Orders of the Rising Sun
 Paul C. Lauterbur – co-winner of the 2003 Nobel Prize in Physiology or Medicine, for discoveries leading to creation of Magnetic Resonance Imaging
 Matthew N. Levy – cardiac physiologist and textbook author
 John J.R. Macleod – co-winner of the 1923 Nobel Prize in Physiology or Medicine, for discovery of insulin
 Sidney Wilcox McCuskey – astronomer noted for his work on the Milky Way galaxy
 Albert A. Michelson – winner of the 1907 Nobel Prize in Physics, for disproving existence of "ether"; first American to receive a Nobel Prize
 Edward Morley – performed interferometry experiment with Michelson
 Ferid Murad – co-winner of the 1998 Nobel Prize in Physiology or Medicine, for role in the discovery of nitric oxide in cardiovascular signaling
 George A. Olah – winner of the 1994 Nobel Prize in Chemistry, for contributions to carbocation chemistry
 Amit Patel – stem cell surgeon who demonstrated stem cell transplantation can treat congestive heart failure
 Raymond Stanton Patton (Ph.B.) – engineer, rear admiral and first flag officer of the United States Coast and Geodetic Survey Corps and second Director of the United States Coast and Geodetic Survey (1929–1937)
 M. Scott Peck – psychiatrist and author of The Road Less Traveled
 David Pedlar — Director of Research at the National Headquarters of Veterans Affairs Canada
 James Polshek – architect; designed William J. Clinton Presidential Library
 Edward C. Prescott – co-winner of the 2004 Nobel Prize in Economic Sciences, for theory on business cycles and economic policies
 Charles Burleigh Purvis (1865) – leading physician at Howard University and the Freedmen's Hospital
 Frederick Reines – co-winner of the 1995 Nobel Prize in Physics, for the detection of the neutrino
 Barry Richmond – developer of the iThink simulation environment
 Frederick C. Robbins – co-winner of the 1954 Nobel Prize in Physiology or Medicine, for work on polio virus, which led to development of polio vaccines; past president of the Institute of Medicine of the National Academy of Sciences
 M. Frank Rudy – inventor of the Nike air sole
 John Ruhl – physicist currently studying cosmic microwave background radiation
 David Satcher – U.S. Surgeon General under President Clinton; first African-American director of the Centers for Disease Control and Prevention
 Terry Sejnowski – pioneer in the field of neural networks and computational neuroscience; one of only ten living scientists to have been elected to all three national academies (IOM, NAS and NAE)
 Jesse Leonard Steinfeld – U.S. Surgeon General (1969–1973), noted for achieving widespread fluoridation of water, requiring prescription drugs to be effective, and strengthening the Surgeon General's warning on cigarettes
 Earl W. Sutherland – winner of 1971 Nobel Prize in Physiology or Medicine, for establishing identity and importance of cyclic AMP in regulation of cell metabolism
 Lars Georg Svensson – instrumental in the development of minimally invasive keyhole surgery and leader in aortic valve surgery
 Peter Tippett – developer of the first anti-virus software, "Vaccine" (later sold and renamed Norton AntiVirus)
 Alfred Wilhelmi – biochemist, medical researcher, and academic

Sports

 Ed Andrews – Major League Baseball player
 John Badaczewski – professional football player for the Washington Redskins and Chicago Bears
 Steve Belichick – professional football player for the Detroit Lions and college football coach; father of NFL coach Bill Belichick 
 Manute Bol – at one time the tallest player to play in the National Basketball Association
 Dick Booth – professional football player for the Detroit Lions
 Wendy Cohn (Termini) – sports attorney 
 Esther Erb – marathon runner
 Ed Kagy – professional football player and founder of Gyro International 
 William Kerslake – Olympic wrestler and co-inventor of the first ion thruster for space propulsion
 Sandy Knott – Olympic runner for outdoor track and field
 Warren Lahr – NFL All-Pro defensive back who played 11 seasons with the Cleveland Browns
 Bill Lund – professional football player for the Cleveland Browns
 Ray Mack – professional baseball player for the Cleveland Indians, New York Yankees, and Chicago Cubs; All-Star second baseman in 1940
 Michael McCaskey – chairman of the board, Chicago Bears
 Paul O'Dea – outfielder for the Cleveland Indians
 Peggy Parratt – professional football player credited for throwing the first forward pass in professional football
 Phil Ragazzo – professional football player for the Cleveland Rams, Philadelphia Eagles, and New York Giants
 Mike Rodak – professional football player for the Cleveland Rams, Detroit Lions, and Pittsburgh Steelers
 George Roman – professional football player for the New York Giants
 Frank Ryan – professional football player; quarterback for the Cleveland Browns; holds a PhD in math
 Mickey Sanzotta – professional football player for the Detroit Lions 
 Don Shula (MA Physical Education '53) – former coach of the Miami Dolphins, member of Pro Football Hall of Fame
 Denny Shute – professional golfer, British Open and PGA Championship champion
 Bianca Smith – first black woman hired to coach for Major League Baseball, hired for the Boston Red Sox
 Mark Termini – Hall of Fame basketball player for Case Western Reserve University, sports attorney and NBA agent/contract negotiator 
 Del Wertz – professional football and baseball player 
 Dan Whalen – Arena Football League quarterback for the Cleveland Gladiators and Orlando Predators
 Johnny Wilson – professional football player for the Cleveland Rams

See also
List of Case Western Reserve University Nobel laureates

References

External links

 
 
Case Western Reserve University people
Case Western Reserve University people